Double-Span Metal Pratt Truss Bridge is a historic Pratt truss bridge over the Ausable River at Keeseville in Clinton County and Essex County, New York.  It was built in 1877 by the Murray Dougal & Company of Milton, Pennsylvania.  It is 214 feet in length and 16 feet wide. It consists of two 107 foot spans supported by a pier at mid-stream.  It is the oldest extant example of a metal Pratt truss bridge in New York State.

The bridge carries Liberty Street over the Ausable River between Ausable Street and River River. It was listed on the National Register of Historic Places in 1999. In 2008 it was closed, and was in anticipation of repairs.

References

Bridges in Clinton County, New York
Bridges in Essex County, New York
Bridges completed in 1877
Road bridges on the National Register of Historic Places in New York (state)
National Register of Historic Places in Clinton County, New York
National Register of Historic Places in Essex County, New York
Metal bridges in the United States
Pratt truss bridges in the United States
1877 establishments in New York (state)